First Congregational Church of Riverside is located at 3504 Mission Inn Ave, Riverside, California. It was founded in 1872 and is a part of the United Church of Christ (UCC). The congregation has a long history of social activism and continues to be a voice for progressive Christianity in the Inland Empire.

History 
FCC was the first church in Riverside, CA, when it was founded April 1, 1872.  Frank Miller, owner and proprietor of the Mission Inn, became a member in 1878 and led the effort to build the current building completed in 1914.  The building was designed by Myron Hunt in the Spanish Churriguerresque (Baroque) style. It is now designated as a historical landmark.

The congregation itself also has a remarkable history. Generations of FCC members have taken stands for justice and equality over the years.  Booker T. Washington accepted an invitation to speak for the congregation on March 22, 1914. During the internment of Japanese Americans in World War II, FCC held the assets of the Japanese American church in Riverside so the property could be returned to the rightful owners at the end of the internment. In 1995, FCC became an Open and Affirming congregation, celebrating people of all walks of life in full membership of the church, including LGBT individuals.  The congregation continues today to take stands of justice, including Black Lives Matter, support of Muslim communities, and LGBT equality.

In 2022 the church celebrated its 150th year.

References

External links 
 https://fccriverside.org/

United Church of Christ churches in California
1872 establishments in California